Erick Ramón Rizo Rojas (born 28 February 1991) is a Cuban footballer who plays for Santiago de Cuba and the Cuba national team.

International statistics

International goals
Scores and results list Barbados' goal tally first.

References

External links
 

1991 births
Living people
Cuban footballers
Cuba international footballers
Association football midfielders
FC Santiago de Cuba players
2019 CONCACAF Gold Cup players
Sportspeople from Santiago de Cuba
21st-century Cuban people